Boksburg is a city on the East Rand (Ekhuruleni) of Gauteng province of South Africa. Gold was discovered in Boksburg in 1887. Boksburg was named after the State Secretary of the South African Republic, W. Eduard Bok. The Main Reef Road linked Boksburg to all the other major mining towns on the Witwatersrand and the Angelo Hotel (1887) was used as a staging post.

Boksburg has been part of the City of Ekurhuleni Metropolitan Municipality since 5 December 2000, which forms the local government of most of the East Rand.

The Mining Commissioner Montague White built a large dam which, empty for years, was dubbed White's Folly until a flash flood in 1889 silenced detractors. The 150,000 square metre dam is now the Boksburg Lake, and is surrounded by lawns, trees, and terraces.

History 
Prior to 1860, the present municipal area of Boksburg and its immediate environs comprised mainly the highveld farms called Leeuwpoort, Klippoortje, Klipfontein and Driefontein. Carl Ziervogel bought the farm Leeuwpoort in 1875 and for 300 morgen of barren, rocky veld he paid £75. In September 1886 Pieter Killian, a young Afrikaans prospector, discovered quartz reefs on Leeuwpoort.
 
He also discovered quartz reefs on the farm Vogelfontein, named after Adolf Vogel.

Samples of the quartz were sent to Pretoria for assaying,which confirmed the presence of gold. Killian advised Dr W.E. Bok, Secretary of State for the Transvaal Republic,
of the results of the assay. The result was the proclamation, on 10 March 1887, of the two farms as public diggings. Carl Ziervogel, who had been trying to sell Leeuwpoort, now opened the first gold mine on the East Rand, the Ziervogel Gold Mining Company.

Cornish miners were brought out to work the diggings. Unfortunately, it soon transpired that heavy expenditure was necessary for development, and as the Directors were unable to finance this, the mine closed down.

Mr Abe Bailey of the Barnato Group, which owned the Johannesburg Consolidated Investment Company (JCI), bought the farm Leeuwpoort in 1894 for £100,000. The mynpacht (mining lease) was controlled by JCI, who established E.R.P.M. Ltd, which is still carrying on mining operations after 120 years. JCI also developed many residential suburbs over the years.

Gold was also found at Elsburg, 8 km to the southwest. Elsburg was a recognized stopping point for coaches and wagon traffic. The first Government offices were at Elsburg and what was to become Boksburg was but a suburb of Elsburg. With the real centre of mining being centred on Boksburg, however, soon President Paul Kruger ordered that a new town be laid out to accommodate the miners. Land for the new town was released by having the boundaries of the farms Leeuwpoort, Driefontein and Klipfontein moved back from where they met. The newly created farm was called Vogelfontein,  on which 1000 stands of 50x50 feet each were created. The new town of Boksburg was named after Dr Bok. In 1887 the first auction sale of stands took place, at which prices of £5 to £25 were realized.
 
Also in 1887 the Republican Government built the Post Office and the Mining Commissioner's office. Business and residential properties began to be built in the fledgling town in its first year of existence.
 
In 1888 coal deposits were discovered right on the boundary of the new town, and here coal was first mined in the Transvaal. This started an era of company promotion and syndicate formation, with ground fetching high prices. Enterprises of all kinds were set up and Boksburg began to emerge from a mining camp atmosphere to a fully-fledged town. Coal ensured that the gold mining industry would grow to a formidable size.

Originally, Boksburg was laid out in 1887 to serve the surrounding gold mines, and named after the State Secretary of the South African Republic, Eduard Bok. The Main Reef Road linked Boksburg to all the other major mining towns on the Witwatersrand and the Angelo Hotel was used as a production post. A railway was built by the Netherlands-South African Railway Company (NZASM) to link Boksburg to Johannesburg in 1890.

The first coal mine was called Gauf's Mine after the Manager Mr J.L. Gauf. Others were the Good Hope, Ferndale and many more. There now arose a pressing need for a more sophisticated coal distribution system than using teams of ox wagons. The mine owners strongly advocated a railway line between Johannesburg and Boksburg, but this was opposed by the wagoners. President Kruger managed to persuade the Volksraad to approve the building of a "tram" line, ostensibly to transport passengers only! The Rand Tram (so named as to appease the transport riders) opened in 1890, between Johannesburg's Park station and Boksburg station. The line was subsequently extended to Brakpan and Springs, where large deposits of superior quality coal had been discovered. Also, deposits of high grade fireclay were discovered in Boksburg, which gave impetus to development of a fireclay manufacturing industry. All this helped the importance of the gold mining industry.
 
Coal mining came to an end in 1895 after underground fires broke out, rendering the entire mining area unsafe.

 
Immediately to the north of Boksburg Township was a large muddy vlei fed by a small stream from the North-East. This vlei was the only watering place for stock between Middelburg and Johannesburg and the government received strong representations from transport riders and others for improved watering facilities near the public outspan west of the town. It was accordingly decided to build a small dam at the outlet of the vlei. Work on the dam was not proceeding satisfactorily, so Montague White, appointed Mining Commissioner of the Boksburg Goldfields in 1888, was asked by President Kruger to look into the matter. White said soon after arriving in Boksburg that the place was one of  the "most uninviting spots" he had ever seen. Two things dear to him were needed: a stream or well-ordered sheet of water and trees, instead of the barren area of muddy pools which he found.
 
White was able to persuade a reluctant President to build a larger dam than was originally envisaged, because he visualised the ugly vlei being transformed into a beautiful lake fringed with trees. However, after completion, the new lake stood empty for nearly two years and became known as "White's folly". In 1891 the rains came, there was a cloudburst north of the dam one night and the next morning the citizens awoke to find a large lake filled and running over. Ever since then, it has been a popular and attractive feature of Boksburg and an integral part of its central area.

After the discovery of gold in the late 1800s, people of all races flocked to Boksburg; some hoped to get rich, others just wanted employment. Most workers initially resided in the Boksburg North area but another area was later established for all mine workers dubbed, Julewe, the Zuluword for Place of Work.

The Government of the time declared that all coloured, Asian and black people should live in Julewe, which was situated between two wetlands and close to the Cinderella and Hercules Mine Shafts. Julewe was divided in two by the main road, Church Road, running through it, with black mine workers on the one side, and coloureds, who moved to the Transvaal from the Eastern Cape, on the other. Close to the entrance of the township, was the Asian trading market known as Kalamazoo. The Hercules Mine Shaft was the deepest shaft in the world. The headgear and structures were demolished in 2007. The Julewe community soon started schools and churches, and the Boksburg Coloured School, now known as Goedehoop Primary, is the oldest school in Boksburg, as it opened in 1905, with Mr G W Van Rooyen as the principal.

By 1911, the township was renamed Stirtonville, after the superintendent of the area. As a precaution, and to monitor the number of residents in the area, residents of Stirtonville each received a residential permit, while people who wanted to visit family or friends residing in the township, had to obtain a temporary day-pass, in order to enter the township. Even the strict control of the "Black Jack" officers who patrolled the township failed to detect a few people creeping in and hiding in the dense township. One such person was the Nobel prize-winner and former President Nelson Mandela. It is rumoured that Mandela hid in Stirtonville, with authorities hot on his heels. Years later, Mandela returned to this area, where he was given the Freedom of the City.

During the 1960s, all the black residents were moved to a new township on the border of Boksburg and Germiston, called Vosloorus and the Asian residents to Actonville, and Stirtonville became the sole residential area of the coloured community. The community decided to rename their suburb to Reiger Park, in 1962. Two years later, town council agreed to change the street names, which were mainly African in origin. The Reiger Park Stadium was built upon a cemetery, mainly used for Chinese mine workers; the remains were never removed. Reiger Park has developed a fearful reputation, mainly due to gang violence. Today it is a community focussed on change and remaining positive to build a bright future. The township has over 100 formal and informal churches, four primary school, two high schools, and some community facilities, including a public library and swimming pool.

The oldest mosque in the Gauteng area was also to be found in this suburb, but a 2003 fire destroyed it completely. In 2003 a new mosque, Masjid Al-Noor, was erected.

Mayors 
Although Boksburg was the third mining town founded on the Witswaterand, after Johannesburg and Germiston, it was the first to inaugurate its mayor.

Boksburg was incorporated into the greater Ekurhuleni Metropolitan Municipality in 2000 and therefore no longer has its own mayor since that date.

Historical buildings

Historic hotels
Angelo Hotel (1887) - Main Reef Road
Boksburg North Hotel - Cason Road
King's Hotel - Church Street
Transvaal Hotel - Buitekant Street
Masonic Hotel - Market Street
Central Hotel - Commissioner Street
East Rand Hotel - Station Street

Masonic
The Boksburg Lodge No. 2480 was one of the twelve lodges constituting the District in 1895 A number of Freemasons gathered in Boksburg in November 1892, and having decided to form a lodge, voted as to whether it should be 'English' or 'Scottish'. The former prevailed by the narrowest of margins (13 to 12). By courtesy of the Landdrost the Lodge was able to meet in the Court House for two years but no time was wasted in finding a 'permanent' home, which was built and ready for occupation by 1895. Initially the Lodge was so active that within 12 months it resolved that the membership should not exceed 100.

The Lodge supported the formation of the District Grand Lodge but was subsequently very unhappy about the part played by the District Grand Master as a member of the Reform Committee.

After the 1899-1902 recess, the Lodge extended its premises, incurring a debt which was to take 30 years to liquidate. In spite of this the Lodge fully supported masonic appeals and was one of the two lodges in the Transvaal to qualify (in 1934) as a Hall Stone Lodge, based on its support for Grand Lodge's 'Masonic Million Peace memorial' appeal.

In the aftermath of the Second World War the Lodge went through a somewhat stagnant period but recovered by the end of the 1950s. In 1970 it decided to sell its premises as restoration had become uneconomical and this led to the Lodge providing the greater part of the cost of the Central East Rand masonic centre, completed in 1976.

An outstanding personal contribution to Freemasonry in the Transvaal was made by the WM in 1907/8, Bro R S Rigg, who was successively DG Registrar, President of the Board of General Purposes and Deputy District Grand Master between 1925 and 1940. He was also very active in the additional Orders, including being District Grand Master of the Mark and the first Provincial Prior for the Transvaal in the Knights Templar.

Reference: 'A Century of Brotherhood' by A A Cooper & D E G Vieler.

Infamous incidents

Political assassination 
Chris Hani, leader of the South African Communist Party and chief of staff of Umkhonto we Sizwe, the armed wing of the African National Congress (ANC), was assassinated outside his Dawn Park home in 1993 and is buried in the Elspark's South Park cemetery.

Consumer boycott
On 30 November 1988 the town councils of Vosloorus and Reiger Park staged a consumer boycott in Boksburg. The boycott by Black and Coloured residents followed the reintroduction of petty apartheid measures by the Conservative Party (CP) controlled town council. In the local elections of October 1988 the CP won 12 of 20 council seats. At its first meeting, the new Council decreed that it would begin rigorously enforcing the Separate Amenities Act, a by-then largely ignored law that re-established Whites-only toilets, parks and sports facilities. The two Townships found enthusiastic corporate support. A number of multinational companies like Colgate-Palmolive, American Cyanamid and Unilever provided buses to ferry shoppers to stores in neighbouring towns, cancelled expansion plans and ran advertisements denouncing the racist Council. The economy of the town suffered and several businesses had to close down. Boksburg was the largest of 104 municipalities in South Africa to fall into Conservative hands.

Murder: Body in suitcase
The Boksburg Lake (& Wemmer Pan & Zoo Lake) murder: On the morning of 27 October  1964 a young teacher, Mr Robert Bekker, made a grisly discovery. On the western shore of Boksburg Lake, in a suitcase was a middle-aged woman's decapitated torso, covered in plastic, brown paper and a sheet. Although there were numerous stab wounds in her chest and back, a postmortem revealed that these had been inflicted after her death. The victim had first been battered and then had her throat cut.
She had been in the water between 24 and 48 hours. Immediately, a call went out to police stations in the region for the names and descriptions of any women recently reported missing. A
number of replies were received, but none matched the description of the victim. Also, the victim's fingerprints did not match any on record. A public appeal for information led to the anticipated crop of hoaxers as well as those genuinely eager to assist. Despite front-page headlines, country-wide publicity and numerous appeals by the police, the identity of the victim remained a complete mystery.

A second piece of the puzzle unfolded at Wemmer Pan, Johannesburg, on Saturday 7 November. In the middle of a School Rowing regatta a suitcase floated to the surface, and when opened, proved to contain the Boksburg Lake victim's dismembered legs. It was also thought, by the man who pulled the case from the water, that there had been "something else" in the case which sank to the bed of the dam. It may have been the head. Immediately the area was cordoned off and police frogmen searched frantically for several days but nothing was found in the drained dam. Finally the police concluded that the "something" was, in fact, a foetus which had been devoured by underwater insects and larvae. The finder was Mr Joseph Whiteside Cole of Germiston.
 
Then, on 17 December, two boys fishing at Zoo Lake in Johannesburg hooked a plastic bag containing a woman's toothless head. It was in an advanced state of decomposition, making the features unrecognizable, and clearly had been in the water for some weeks.
 
Forensic pathologists and artists spent the next 24 hours putting together a set of drawings of the victim's face. These were published on 18 December and the police were confident that it would be merely a matter of time before the victim's identity was established. In fact it took almost four years before a positive identification was made. This was in spite of the fact that the victim's daughter, Catherine Cronje, gave the police the correct identification of the victim (Mrs Catherine Burch) and was certain that the victim was her mother. However, her family and fiancé talked her out of visiting the mortuary. Almost a year later an inquest was held in Boksburg, where the verdict was given as 'death unascertained'. The remains were buried in a pauper's grave. In August 1968, Catherine (now Mrs van Coppenhagen) decided that she would wait no longer and told a certain Police Captain, James Beeslaar, of her fears and convictions. He reopened the case and, in particular, started searching for the dead woman's husband, Ronald Burch, who had not been seen for four years.

Burch, who had matriculated at Boksburg High School, was a ladies man and had been married and divorced three times before he met Catherine Cronje, whom he married shortly after her divorce in 1962.
After Catherine's disappearance, Burch resigned from his job, told his wife's employer that she had taken ill suddenly and would not be returning to work, collected the salary owing to her and then vanished. The police later established that early in 1965 Burch had moved to 65 Berea Road, Bertrams in Johannesburg, where he lived with his widowed mother for some months.

On 27 November 1968, the police again interviewed Burch's mother (the first time being on 4 October). She initially denied that her son was staying with her, but eventually broke down and admitted that he was in a room in the back yard and gave the police a key.
 
When the police unlocked the door, they found Ronald Burch standing in the middle of the room wearing home-made bracelets made from tins to which he had soldered electrical wires that were plugged into a wall socket. As the door opened, Burch flicked the switch, electrocuting himself. Moments later he was dead.
 
It took another 10 days for the final strand in this tragedy to be unravelled. Proof positive was needed to link the dead man and woman together. This proof came from a letter, written by Catherine Burch, which Catherine van Coppenhagen handed to the police. An expert in the police fingerprinting bureau found a fingerprint on the letter that matched the one on the corpse. The body in the lake had finally been identified.
 
In May 1969, the inquest on Catherine Burch was reopened. Although the police had solved this bizarre murder, the actual cause of death could still not be established and was recorded once again as 'unascertained'.

Boksburg explosion

At least 37 people died, and 40 others were injured when a fuel tanker that was carrying and transporting liquefied petroleum gas (LPG) exploded on 24 December 2022. The truck got caught beneath a bridge close to Tambo Memorial Hospital. The explosion caused damage to nearby houses.
The driver of the vehicle was subsequently arrested on 25 December 2022 but released without appearing in court on 28 December due to lack of evidence against him.

Tambo Memorial Hospital

The Tambo Memorial Hospital, previously known as Boksburg Benoni Hospital, is a regional hospital situated in Boksburg. It is one of the oldest hospitals in Gauteng, opened in 1905 as the Boksburg-Benoni Hospital, a joint hospital of the State and East Rand Proprietary Mines.Tambo Memorial Hospital has about 640 beds with a staff complement of approximately 1100. The hospital provides service in Benoni, Boksburg, and part of Germiston to a population of >1 million. All basic services are provided to in and outpatients. Specialist services include Ophthalmology, Dermatology, Rheumatology, ENT, HIV and Podiatry. Allied services include Physiotherapy, Occupational therapy, Human nutrition/Dietician, Radiology (X-ray department), Social Work, Psychology, Optometry (Eye Clinic), Orthopaedic Centre (Orthotic & Prosthetic devices) and Medical (Maintenance of Hospital equipment) workshop.

Economy
Boksburg boasts a diversified industrial and mining centre. It has become one of the most important gold-producing towns on the Witwatersrand.

The following industrial companies have head offices in Boksburg:
 Macsteel
 Fraser Alexander
 EL Bateman

Boksburg is home to the East Rand Mall which is one of the largest and most popular malls in Gauteng.

Global consumer goods manufacturers Unilever and Colgate Palmolive have factories in Boksburg. Africa's biggest consumer brand company Tiger Brands also has a factory in Boksburg.

Firsts
Mr. Jan Haar, a Hollander, was the first post master
A general dealer's store was opened by Messrs. Osbrone and Chapman
A hotel by Mr. Carpenter. The first hotel was opened during 1887 by Mr. Paul Neubauer, facing the present Town Hall. Shortly afterwards, Mr. F. Jackson opened the present Masonic Hotel for his wife. The third hotel (Nobby's Hotel) was opened by Mr. E. B. Henrey, opposite the post office
During the same year Messrs. Osborne and Chapman, of Elsburg, dissolved their partnership, Mr. CHAPMAN taking over the business at Elsburg. Mr. F. Osborne opened a general dealer's store at Boksburg opposite the old butchery of the late Mr. Fargher, with one Ehrenbacher as partner
During 1888 the first bakery was opened by Messrs. Charlie Penny and Duffy, and later on sold to Mr. Sam Dicks, who supplied bread along the Reef as far as Van Ryn and Modderfontein
During 1889 Mr. B. Owen Jones opened the first chemist's shop. The second chemist's shop was opened in 1892 by Mr. A. R. Champion. During 1898 the following businesses were opened: a millinery store opposite the south corner of the Market Square by Dodds and Robertson; an ironmongery store by Hardie and Symington; an aerated waters factory and produce store by the brothers,Arthur and Jack Perks. The latter was later on sold to Lowenstein and Mendelsohn
The first decent building was the Assembly Hall, which was built by a syndicate of which Mr. Tom Ziervogel was a member
The first doctor at Boksburg was Dr. F. Ziervogel, later District Surgeon. During 1889 Mr. Maberly came to Boksburg; he only practised for a few months when he left. Dr. Steenburg and Dr. Cunningham practised in opposition for many years
The first Hypermarket in South Africa was opened by Pick 'n Pay in Boksburg on 19 March 1975. The first-day's turnover was R 176 000
The first detection of a neutrino in nature was made in Boksburg's ERPM gold mine by a group led by Friedel Sellschop in February 1965

Transportation 
Boksburg is also served with a well developed transportation system. The city is very close to the OR Tambo International Airport. Although OR Tambo International is situated in Kempton Park, the southern quarter of the runway is in the northern part of Boksburg and the city of Boksburg is also served by the OR Tambo International Airport. The city is also served by the Metrorail line, the Springs-Johannesburg Line. Boksburg is served by 3 national routes and 3 regional routes, the N3, N12, N17, R21, R29 and the R554. The N3 is a northwest–southeast national route that is connecting Boksburg with Johannesburg in the north-western part and Harrismith in the south-east. The N12 is the east–west national route that is connecting Boksburg with Daveyton in the east and with Johannesburg in the west. The N17 is another east–west national route connecting Boksburg with Springs in the east and with the southern parts of Johannesburg in the west. The R21 is a North-South Freeway, with its terminal in Vosloorus in the south and connects with the OR Tambo International, Kempton Park and Pretoria in the north. The R29 is an east–west regional route that is connecting Boksburg with Benoni in the East and with Germiston in the west. The R554 Connecting Boksburg with Springs and Brakpan in the east and with Alberton in the west.

ERPM Golf Club
ERPM Golf Club came into being in 1903 when 3 holes were built around the first school in Boksburg, a wood and iron structure that is still standing today. The building was also used as the first clubhouse and is situated on the right hand side of the first fairway.

In 1906, 18 holes were completed. The President at the time was Colonel Sir George Farrar DSO, who was instrumental in floating East Rand Property Mines Limited on 8 May 1893. The captain of the club was D McKay. The first recorded Club Champion was F N Critlends in 1913.

In 1926, under the supervision of Peter Coetzer, who served the club as Secretary / Green Keeper for 51 years, the fairways were hand planted by the members, and Fir trees were planted. Some of these trees are still a major feature of the course. Many of these old Fir trees are dying.

ERPM has a number of Springboks that were avid members of the club, namely, Alma Truss, Jill Kennedy, Jimmy Boyd, Denis Hutchison, Neville Sundelson, Neville Clarke and dean van Staden. As well as provincial players too numerous to mention, one of ERPM's well known professionals, John Bland, playing with members on a Wednesday afternoon shot an amazing 59. He also holed out on the par 4 tenth playing against the club manager in a Friday afternoon four ball.

In 1992, the club was still controlled by the mine and soon thereafter the control and running of the club was solely in the hands of members. In mid-1992 a decision was taken to revamp the course and in October of that year work started. Using the same layout the greens were completely reshaped and rebuilt, the bunkers redesigned and the water reticulation system replaced. Between 1 October 1992 and the reopening of the course on 1 May 1993 golf was played on 18 temporary greens. The chairman at the time, Willie Tredoux, had the honour of opening the new ERPM Golf Course.

ERPM Golf Club's emblem is an owl sitting on a golf club. In fact all of the mine sports club's have the same owl on their respective badges and flags.

The owl came into being as the emblem as a result of the relentless sounding of the mine hooter, at regular intervals every day and night, which was activated by the steam driven boilers.

The start of every shift was heralded by the hooter, as was the beginning and end of lunch and tea breaks. The hooter, it seems, was used for many other reasons as well.

Eventually, after numerous complaints, the hooter was silenced. However, "The Hooters", the name adopted by ERPM sport teams during the early mining years, have not been silenced. "The Hooters" are a proud bunch of sportsman and sportswomen who are respected for their competitive spirit and loyalty to the owl of ERPM.

ERPM/Boksburg Rugby Club
ERPM rugby club was established in 1903 by the ERPM mine. The club adopted the badge of the mine as its logo. The prominent part of the badge is the owl and the club nickname became Hooters. The mining rugby clubs, ERPM, Rand Leases, Simmer and Jack, Diggers and Pirates formed the core of the Transvaal Rugby Football Union. After the demise of the mine the name was changed to the Boksburg Rugby Club. The club presently form part of the Falcons Rugby Union.

Schools 
Hoërskool Voortrekker (29 January 1920) - the first Afrikaans medium high school on the Witwatersrand
Boksburg High School (11 February 1920) - Boksburg High and Voortrekker shared premises in Nobby bar and Morris arcade before moving to their current premises

Hoërskool Dr EG Jansen (2 August 1958)
Christian Brothers' College (1935)
St Dominic's Catholic School for Girls (31 July 1923)
Sunward Park High School
Hoërskool Oosterlig (1992) - formed out of Commercial High/Handelskool 1917, the first high school in South Africa specialising in commercial subjects
Wit Deep Primary (1907)
Laerskool Hennie Basson - later became Oosrand, joined with Laerskool JM Louw
Laerskool Baanbreker
Laerskool Concordia
Laerskool Van Dyk Park
Martin Primary School
Parkrand Primary School
Parkdene Primary School
Freeway Park Primary School
Laerskool Goudrand
Wit Deep Primary School
Windmill Park Secondary School
Villa Lisa Secondary School (2012)
Falcon Educational College

Notable people

Arts and entertainment
Vanessa Do Céu Carreira - Miss South Africa 2001
Dawid Engela (30 October 1931 – 25 November 1967) - broadcaster, composer and musicologist
Konrad Giering - figure skater
John Ireland - multi-instrumentalist
Molly Lamont - actress, The Awful Truth
Jans Rautenbach (22 February 1936 – 2 November 2016) - screenwriter and Afrikaans film producer/director
Angelique Rockas - actress/producer/activist, founder of Internationalist Theatre  UK
Jamie Uys (30 May 1921 – 29 January 1996) - Afrikaans and International Film producer/director

Judges
Judge Richard Goldstone
Judge Mahomed Navsa

Politicians
Barend du Plessis - Minister of Finance 
Barbara Hogan - Minister of Public Enterprise, former Health Minister, anti-apartheid activist, St Dominic's Catholic School for Girls, Boksburg
Chris Hani, leader of the South African Communist Party and chief of staff of Umkhonto we Sizwe
Ian Neilson, Deputy Mayor of Cape Town
JPI "Sakkie" Blanche - Mayor of Boksburg, MP, MEC Gauteng

Academics
 Glenda Gray - HIV Researcher
 John McDowell - philosopher at University of Pittsburgh

Sport achievers – National colours
John Bland - professional Golfer
Conrad Jantjes - Springbok Rugby player, 2001
Don Kitchenbrand - Springbok Soccer player
Hennie Muller - Springbok Rugby captain
Andre Nel - Protea fast bowler
Hennie Otto - professional Golfer
Bernard Parker - professional Football Player Bafana Bafana
John Smith - Olympian gold medal winner lightweight coxless fours, London 2012
Douglas Erasmus - Olympian Swimmer, Rio 2016
Joyce Ross - South African swimming champion - breaststroke
Frederick Johannes (Tubba) Luttig - Springbok Waterpolo player 1962 Games+ - Chosen for many subsequent  years

Boksburg boxers
Gerrie Coetzee - former WBA World and South Africa heavy weight boxing champion
Sibusiso Zingange - South African junior lightweight champion 
Thomas Oosthuizen - former IBO super middleweight champion

Tennis players

 Rod Mandelstam (born 1942), South African tennis player

Boksburg legends

Boksburg's First Mayoral Citizen: Benjamin Owen-Jones
On 1 December 1903, a Special meeting was held in the Council Chambers for the purpose of electing Boksburg's first Mayor. Prior to Captain Colley of The Health Board vacating the chair, he advised a sum of £2,892.17.3 had been transferred in favour of the Municipality. Once the formalities were completed, he then called or nominations for the Mayoral position. "Councillor J Morris J.P. moved that Councillor Benjamin Owen Jones be elected Mayor with Councillor Dobson seconding the motion" and so Boksburg's first mayor took office.

"When Mr B Owen Jones was elected Mayor of Boksburg in 1903, he also became the only mayor in  the Transvaal, beating that other upstart mining camp, Johannesburg, by about an hour."

Under his administration certain roads were "macadamized", an agreement was entered into with the Rand Water a Municipal Fire Brigade was formed, electric lights were installed, sanitary system was put into practice, building, fire, and gambling by-laws were put into effect. The old iron and wood municipal offices were replaced with the town hall, a town valuer was appointed and a Voters Roll was compiled.

Mayor B Owen Jones summed up his first year in office as: "For situation our town is unsurpassed, and it can be made the ideal spot in the colony" and the lead article in the East Rand Express stated that:
"Boksburg has reached an interesting stage in its existence. In many respects it is a country village, in others it is a town. The transition in not completed."

One of Boksburg's earliest pioneers, Mr B Owen Jones, a chemist by profession, arrived in the area in the mid 1880s. He started a business supplying the new mining fraternity with the heavy chemical and laboratory equipment needed. As the population grew an entrepreneurial Mr B Owen Jones diversified his chemical business to fulfill the needs of the growing communities in the region. He started importing medicinal and fancy goods and opened a wholesale chemist shop in Boksburg followed by a manufacturing plant in Standerton and as the needs of the population grew he opened more chemist shops in Van Rhyn, Springs, Benoni, Brakpan and Standerton. A distinction to his chain of shops was the monopoly he had for Zeiss Cameras.

Besides holding the office as the first Mayor of Boksburg, a post he held three times, 1903/1904, 1904/1905 and 1911/1912, he had the distinction of holding the office of President of the Transvaal Pharmaceutical Board from 1904 to 1908. Mr B Owen Jones served on the executive board of the Transvaal Pharmaceutical Society and held office as president in 1915 to 1916. During his first mayoral term Benjamin Owen Jones also held office as President of the Boksburg Chamber of Commerce in 1903.

Mr B Owen Jones was not only our town's very first mayor, an astute businessman and an excellent administrator; he was also a very active chorist in the Presbyterian Church Choir. He died in Natal in 1920.

Nobby Henrey
"Nobby Henrey' was the personification of the Rand Pioneer. He was open-hearted, generous to a fault, his good deeds can hardly be counted, and many a Boksburg resident down on his or her luck have reason to bless the day they met him." Born in Cradock in 1861, Edward Barrett Henrey decided to try his luck at the gold diggings in Barberton at the age of eighteen. Unsuccessful, he returned home but the lure of gold got the better of him and he returned to the old Transvaal and eventually arrived in Elsburg in 1885.

In 1886, when erven were auctioned off in Boksburg he selected a stand opposite the Old Post Office and there established what was to become the renowned "Nobby's Bar." At the time he built the bar, he didn't realise that his hostelry would eventually be situated in a prime position on the shores of "Montagu's Folly," the Boksburg Lake, which became the "Beautiful Pleasure Resort of the Rand."

From the very beginning, Nobby's Bar was the centre of social life to the Boksburg pioneers. Here most of the meetings took place. It was from here that the first alumni from Voortrekker High School were sent out and it was in Nobby's Bar that the various churches held their services right up until the time first billiard table on the East Rand was imported and placed in position. In one of the outhouses he kept a pet bear sent to him by a friend. Not too much is known about the bear except that this pet of Nobby's almost chewed his daughter's ear off much to his chagrin, but there are no records of whatever became of the animal after this!

"Nobby was an auctioneer and appraiser and for a short period he was a member of the first Council. He was a founder member and "Director of Ceremonies" with the Transvaal Freemasonry Lodge in Boksburg between 1892 and 1909. Early Boksburg had its fill of strange sights, but not the least hilarious must have been seen on that day when the patient horse drawing genial "mine host" past the lake one day took fright and set off down Commissioner Street towards the sun rising. The 280 lbs Nobby finally hauled him to a standstill somewhere near the Market Square."

Edward Barrett Henrey was a full burgher of the ZAR with the outbreak of the Boer War in 1899 and he didn't relish the thought of bearing arms against his own people. Nobby packed his wife and children off to safer climes, he closed his bar and, heavily disguised, he escaped to the Cape Colony by hiding under the seat of a railway carriage. Six months after the end of the war Nobby returned to Boksburg and reopened his bar.

In 1906, he and Mrs Henrey celebrated their 18th wedding anniversary by giving a dance and children's party and he promoted a "Marathon Race" for children under the age of eight. The eleven starters were to run from Boksburg East Station to the Old Post office opposite his hotel." Nobby was an active member of the Boksburg Sporting Club. He loved to play cricket and took part in games all over the Transvaal. He was a member of the cycling team and competed in the Middelburg Jubilee Cycle Race. He toured with the shottist club but his flair for cooking exceeded that of his marksmanship. All the club trophies for all the events were donated by Nobby. Despite being a large man, Nobby defeated his opponent, Mr Marksman, by a huge 40 feet in a sprint event held along Commissioner Street. From the records there is no doubt  that Nobby Henrey was probably the most colourful of the Boksburg Pioneers.
References from a copy of the "East Rand Express" dated 1910, "The Baptist Union Church of Boksburg 1890 -1982" and the following article from the "S A Who's Who 1908.

Henrey, Edward Barrett, Auctioneer & Sworn Appraiser; Born 26 Nov 1861 at Cradock C.C: Son of J E Henery, Royal Navy, Educ. Cradock public School; M 1888 Emma Van der Vyver of Somerset East, C.C.: 5 Children. Hobbies: Racing, shooting, & sports generally. Came to Transvaal 1883: left 1885 to join Gen Warren's Expedition: Returned Oct 1886. Has been connected with Boksburg since its existence & one of the first members of the Sanitary Board & Town Council: is the only surviving member of the originators of Boksburg Masonic Lodge, & the oldest individual license holder in the Witwatersrand & the oldest resident of Boksburg. Proprietor of Nobby's Bar, and familiarly known as Nobby: has Gaika & Galeka War Medals, 1877-8: Basuto Medal & General Service: S A War Medal. Member of Johannesburg.

General CF Beyers

The suburb Beyers Park is named after CF Beyers, a Boer general during the Second Boer War, a bronze bust of him was erected at Hoerskool Voortrekker.

Sir George Farrar
George Herbert Farrar was born in England and brought up by his mother and grandfather in the village of Kempston. He attended Bedford Modern School. He then went to work at his grandfather's business, the Britannia Ironand Steel Works, where he received a background in engineering. He came to South Africa in 1879 to join his brothers Sidney and Percy, with the aim of selling agricultural machinery. At an agricultural show in Johannesburg, Farrar realised that a water drilling machine made by Britannia could be used to discover gold reefs far below the surface. Farrar apparently took a drilling machine to the East Rand and drilled to the south of where the ERPM and Kleinfontein mines were already operating.
 
He then pegged out claims and  went into partnership with Carl Hanau. Farrar earned the nickname "Foxy Farrar" by reputedly going out on Boksburg Lake in the middle of the night in a rowing boat with long wooden poles, and using the poles to peg claims under the Lake! When the gold reefs to the north of Boksburg Lake near Comet were found to continue southwards under Boksburg Lake, towards the areas now known as Parkdene, Freeway Park and Sunward Park, Farrar became very wealthy in 1893 by selling 1,300 claims to ERPM. Farrar received ERPM shares to the value of £705,000 for his claims in the south of Boksburg, excluding Boksburg Lake. Farrar later received more ERPM shares for his claims over Boksburg Lake, and became effectively the controlling shareholder in ERPM.
 
In 1895, Farrar was a member of the so-called "Reform Committee" which plotted to overthrow the government of Paul Kruger, by organising an uprising of new immigrant non-citizens ("Uitlanders") on the Reef and by inviting armed men led by Leander Starr Jameson to invade the Transvaal (Zuid Afrikaanse Republiek) from Mafikeng. Farrar was convicted of High Treason and was sentenced to death in 1896, but the death sentence was later commuted to a fine of £25,000. Farrar's brother Sidney paid this fine by cheque.
 
During the Anglo-Boer war Farrar helped to raise an irregular corps and fought for the British. He was awarded a D.S.O. and was knighted in 1902. After the war, Farrar laid out the township of Benoni; Farrar was not only involved with ERPM, but also with the New Kleinfontein mine in Benoni. Many of the original streets in Benoni are named after places in Farrar's home town in England. Farrar built a large house on Bedford Farm, east of Johannesburg; the township of Bedfordview is named after Farrar's farm.

Farrar became president of the Chamber of Mines in 1902 and agitated for Chinese workers to be imported to work on the Gold Mines to reduce labour costs. Legislation to allow Chinese labour to be brought into the Transvaal was passed in 1904; Farrar was directly responsible for this. Farrar then entered politics and became president of the imperialistic Transvaal Progressive Association. Farrar hoped to become Prime Minister of the Transvaal Colony. In February 1907 elections were held for the Transvaal Legislative Assembly. Farrar was elected to the Assembly for the Boksburg East constituency which included Benoni; but "Het Volk" party of Louis Botha won the elections and Farrar had to be content with becoming Leader of the Opposition.
 
Farrar was one of the Transvaal delegates to the National Convention in 1908. Farrar was on the Transvaal inner Committee together with Jan Smuts, but Farrar had deep suspicions regarding Botha and Smuts, and distrusted the motivations of "Het Volk" party. Farrar was elected to the first Union Parliament in 1910 as member for Georgetown in Germiston. However, his stay in Parliament was short. In 1911 the Government Mining Engineer ordered an enquiry into irregularities and mismanagement at ERPM. Farrar resigned from Parliament to try to sort out the situation at ERPM.
 
Mining company shareholders of ERPM wanted to oust Farrar from his chairmanship of ERPM, but eventually he was allowed to remain as chairman, provided that there was a complete re-organisation of the mine. W.T. Anderson was appointed as supervising engineer at ERPM towards the end of 1911.

In 1913, Farrar was indirectly involved in a confrontation with mineworkers. A newly appointed manager at the New Kleinfontein Mine in Benoni unilaterally changed the working conditions of miners, and miners then came out on strike. Considerable damage occurred during this strike and a number of people were killed. Farrar visited Benoni often during the strike, but refused to meet with the strikers.

When the First World War broke out in August 1914 Farrar was on holiday in England. He returned to South Africa and volunteered to serve against Germany. He was appointed assistant quartermaster-general to the South African forces that landed at Luderitz in Namibia (then occupied by Germany). He was charged with clearing the Luderitz-Keetmanshoop railway line that had been damaged by German colonial soldiers, as they retreated into the interior. Farrar got damaged boreholes at Garub between Luderitz and Kubis working to provide 150,000 gallons of water a day for South African troops. Farrar was killed on 19 May 1915 when his railway inspection car collided head first with a train.

Although Farrar lived at Bedford Farm he travelled to ERPM daily, first on horseback, then later by car. He regularly attended functions and meetings in Boksburg and had a very paternal relationship with ERPM employees and with other Boksburg residents. Every year Farrar ran a Children's Day for ERPM employees, thanking all helpers personally. He would allow Boksburg residents to organise picnics at Bedford Farm. When Farrar was killed, businesses in Boksburg closed as a mark of respect and several thousand people attended a memorial service at Boksburg Lake. The ERPM band led the cortege when Farrar was later buried at Bedford.

The Bentel Family
The Bentel family name has become synonymous with the ever-increasing development in Boksburg. The patriarch of the family, Israel Bentel, arrived in the small mining town in the late 1890 and promptly started working at a trading store, in what is now known as Boksburg North.
"My father later bought the business and further expanded his business interests," said Joe."In April 1913 he married my mother, Polly Berman, they settled into their home in 48 Charl Cilliers Street."Joe is one of seven siblings -- but in 1933 the family bid their final 
farewell to their sister, Leah, who was killed in an accident in Boksburg North.

"Over the years the business in Cason Road grew from a general dealer, known as Bentel Stores, to a store specialising in Manchester, haberdashery and millinery," he said."My three elder brothers Dave, Harry and Max followed in our father's footsteps and opened two more stores in Cason Road, one specialising in motorcycles, bicycles and the other in arms, ammunition and complementary accessories.
In 1928 Israel, who always had a keen interest in property, purchased a tract of land, measuring approximately 75 morgen, extending from what now Rietfontein Road is fronting on North Rand Road. "The roads at that time and until post World War Two, were dusty dirt roads," he said. "Existing homes built on surrounding plots of land were severely damaged by the clay ground, resulting in unsightly cracks thus, rendering the houses uninhabitable."

In the 1940, Israel and his son David, met with representatives of the Provincial Council in Pretoria to investigate future prospects in the area. There was mention of a road being developed which will connect Benoni to the north of Boksburg and beyond.
The visit to Pretoria revealed that a major airport was being planned between Boksburg North and Kempton Park—at that time Palmietfontein Airport, Alberton, was the main airport on the East Rand. Israel realised that his property as well as neighbouring plots would inevitably be developed. The upgrading of Rietfontein Road, extending to Kempton Park, and the development of the N12 highway created the dominance of land extended along the North Rand Road. The two younger sons, Joe and Leonard, became involved in property development in 1960.

Len had qualified as an architect and Joe, launched the development of a property owned by the Bentel family in Westonaria."This development was anchored by a Checkers store and through this development Len and I, were introduced to Raymond Ackerman, who headed up the Checkers chain of supermarkets within the Greaterman organisation," he said."In the late 1960 Raymond formed the Pick 'n Pay organisation and appointed Bentel Abrahamson & Partners. "Len and I proceeded to form the shopping centre development company National Centre Developers which later became known as Retail International." Ackerman, who had investigated the hypermarket concept in Europe, wanted to establish a hypermarket which would serve the East Rand and other regions. In 1970 Len and Joe travelled to Carrefour Conferama in Paris and the Carrefour in Melon at Fontainbleau—this gave them a clear indication of what Ackerman had envisioned for South Africa.

At that time the main road systems, the N12, and the link to Kempton Park had been completed. Jan Smuts airport, now known as Oliver Tambo International became a reality. While Israel owned a portion of the land it was necessary to acquire additional land. Developers were given the go ahead from the former Boksburg Council, in 1965.

A deal was finally struck to acquire all the necessary land required to build the hypermarket, zoning was in place and planning was finalised. Securing finance for the project proved to be daunting as a development of this size (24 000 sqm including parking) had never been developed in South Africa.
Despite their concerns, the Pick 'n Pay Hypermarket opened its doors for convenience shopping in March, 1974. "The store became an immediate success supported by all regions, extending as far afield as Nigel, Witbank, Pretoria and Alberton," he said. 
"In the 1980 we decided to extend the development, thus creating the East Rand Mall, municipal rezoning however, had to be secured in order to proceed."

As the news broke that developers were planning to extend the ever-popular hypermarket, thus creating a one stop major shopping destination. Established businesses in the CBD raised their concerns regarding the competitive effect that the development would have on the city centre.
Despite fierce criticism the council gave its approval of the planned development, in 1985. Retail International proceeded with the development and by 1987 major tenants including Woolworths, Edgars, Clicks, and numerous other national retailers had confirmed their shop space within the centre.

The 1987 municipal elections caused great disruption in the city as Conservative Party won office. "They immediately introduced strict petty apartheid which included the enclosure of the Boksburg Lake to all races other than whites," he said.
"The council's actions instantly made international headlines but back in Boksburg retail companies started to withdraw their support of the proposed East Rand Mall development." There was strong speculation that the East Rand Mall might never be more than an artist impression.

In order to reach a workable solution, Joe requested that Sakkie Blanche, Member of Parliament, arrange a meeting at Parliament. A meeting was arranged with Cabinet ministers and the outcome of this was the relaxation of the Public Amenities Act as well as the withdrawing the non-white restrictions contained therein. By July 1988 the East Rand Mali was back on tract and major retail support was once again secured.

The development was completed in 1990 and has been extended under the ownership of Sanlam Properties who purchased the property in 1994. Bentel Property Consultants was formed in 1995 to pursue the development of the K90 Centre in association with the family of the late David Bentel. Former Boksburg Celebrity of the Year Charlie Bentel heads Bentel Property Consultants.  In addition to the K90 Centre, he has controlled the successful development of the motor dealership complex (a 115-unit townhouse complex) and is currently in the process of developing an office park. The family of the late David Bentel have also successfully developed The Palms and the East Rand Retail Park.

References

External links

1887 establishments in Africa
Populated places established in 1887
East Rand
Populated places in Ekurhuleni
Mining communities in South Africa